Marie Louise of France (28 July 1728 – 19 February 1733) was a French princess as the daughter of Louis XV of France and Queen Marie Leszczyńska.

Biography

Born at the Palace of Versailles, the third child of Louis XV of France and his queen Marie Leszczyńska, she was known as Madame Troisième until her baptism a few weeks before her death.

Her birth was not greeted with much enthusiasm due to her gender; her father had been hoping for a son to call his Dauphin and thus have an heir to the throne. When it was clear that a girl was born, the anticipated celebrations for the expected Dauphin were cancelled and Madame Troisième only had a mass sung in the Chapel of Versailles in her honour.

She grew up at Versailles with her older twin sisters Madame Première and Madame Seconde. The following year, 1729, the three children were joined by the Dauphin of France Louis.

The royal family were again joined by another son in 1730, Philippe de France, "duc d'Anjou". In the winter of 1733, Madame Troisième caught a cold; an epidemic occurred at Versailles at the same time. The child was put in the care of the Gascon doctor Monsieur Bouillac; the doctor administered emetics and had the child bled. Madame Troisième was quickly baptised at Versailles and given the names of her parents Marie and the feminine form of Louis, "Louise". She died at Versailles, exhausted. She was buried at the Royal Basilica of Saint Denis.

Her portrait was painted by Pierre Gobert around 1730. In 1734 a posthumous portrait was painted by Charles-Joseph Natoire who represented her with her sister, the future Madame Adélaïde.

She has been called Louise over time.

Ancestry

References 

1728 births
1733 deaths
18th-century French people
18th-century French women
People from Versailles
French people of Polish descent
Princesses of France (Bourbon)
Burials at the Basilica of Saint-Denis
Children of Louis XV
Royalty and nobility who died as children
Daughters of kings